Alejandro Ferreiro Yazigi (born 18 March 1966) is a Chilean politician and lawyer who served as minister during the first government of Michelle Bachelet (2006–2010).

References

External Links
 Ferreiro Profile at País Digital

1966 births
Living people
Chilean people
University of Chile alumni
University of Notre Dame alumni
21st-century Chilean politicians
Christian Democratic Party (Chile) politicians